The 2022 USF Juniors championship was the inaugural season of USF Juniors. It became the new first rung of the Road to Indy ladder. The season featured a six-round 16-race calendar, 
which began April 23 at Ozarks International Raceway and concluded on September 18 at the Circuit of the Americas.

Drivers and teams

Schedule 

 The round at Ozarks International Raceway was scheduled to have 3 races, but the third race was cancelled due to poor weather conditions. To make up for the cancelled race, a third race was added for the event at Mid-Ohio Sports Car Course.

Race results

Championship standings

Drivers' Championship
Scoring system

 The driver who qualifies on pole is awarded one additional point.
 One point is awarded to the driver who leads the most laps in a race.
 One point is awarded to the driver who sets the fastest lap during the race.

See also
 2022 IndyCar Series
 2022 Indy Lights
 2022 Indy Pro 2000 Championship
 2022 U.S. F2000 National Championship

References

External links
 

USF Juniors
USF Juniors
USF Juniors